The following is a list of districts in Malaysia by population according to the latest national census, which was conducted in 2010.

West Malaysia

East Malaysia

Largest urban agglomerations
The following is a list of 10 largest urban agglomerations, metropolitan areas or conurbations, based on data from the 2010 National Census within district areas. Also included for comparison are the populations within the local governments which are fully or partially covered by the urban agglomerations.

See also
 List of Districts in Malaysia
 Cities of Malaysia
 List of capitals in Malaysia
 List of cities in Malaysia by population

References

Districts by population